The women's elite road race at the 2022 European Road Championships took place on 21 August 2022, in Munich, Germany. Nations were allowed to enter between 1 and 8 riders into the event, dependent on UCI rankings.

Results

References

Women's elite road race